Le Guerno ( or) is a commune in the Morbihan department of Brittany in north-western France. Inhabitants of Le Guerno are called Guernotais.

Points of interest
Zoo and Botanical Garden of Branféré, a zoo and botanical garden

See also
Communes of the Morbihan department

References

External links

Official site 

 Mayors of Morbihan Association 

Communes of Morbihan